Slander is the fourth studio album by deathcore band Dr. Acula, released on February 15, 2011.

Background
On January 7, 2011, the first single online "Cocaine Avalanche" was released for streaming. On January 13, 2011, Victory Records released an album trailer on YouTube which displayed the album's official artwork. On February 9, 2011, a music video was made and released for the song "Who You Gonna Call!?". On January 24, 2012, Dr. Acula premiered their new music video for “Party 2.0” online. "Party 2.0" samples Pee-wee Herman's voice and laughter, and "Welcome to Camp Nightmare" contains a soundclip from the film Friday the 13th Part VI: Jason Lives.

Track listing

Personnel
Dr. Acula
Tyler Guida – vocals
Casey Carrano –  vocals
Joey Simpson – samples, keyboards
Bill Graffeo – guitar
Ricky Ostolaza – guitar
Kevin Graffeo – bass
Jesse Ciappa – drums

Production
Jeremy Comitas - vocals editing, producer, engineer, mixing, mastering
Sierra Shardae - vocals editing
Matt Corrado - illustrations
Doublej Art Direction - design
Jayson DeZuzio - editing, mastering, mixing assistant

References

2011 albums
Dr. Acula (band) albums
Victory Records albums